Nheçu or Chief Nheçu was Guaraní Indian leader who lived during the 17th century in the region of today's municipality of Roque Gonzales, in the Western part of the state of Rio Grande do Sul, in the south of Brazil.

Historical records left behind by the first European settlers and their descendants indicate that in 1628 Nheçu had commanded the slaughter of one native Paraguayan and two Spanish Jesuits missionaries: Roque Gonzales, João de Castilho and Afonso Rodrigues (all three name spellings here are in Brazilian Portuguese). These were the first three Europeans to enter this region of southern Brazil, as far as it is known. Today, they are celebrated as martyrs by the Catholic Church, especially in that part of the Americas.

The center of rule and control of Chief Nheçu is said to have been Cerro do Inhacurutum, an unusual elevation in the form of a hill located in the Ijui river valley. It was also from this place that he tried to resist and stem European colonization, a campaign that ultimately was in vain with the establishment of the Jesuit Missions in the region.

Today there are very few descendants of the Guaraní people in the original territory commanded by Chief Nheçu. However, the area is well populated by European immigrants and their descendants, the Portuguese language prevailing, with some communities still speaking (mostly in the home) dialects of German, Russian, Polish, Italian languages, etc.

See also
 Sepé Tiaraju
 Jesuit Reductions

References
Hoffmann, Nelson (2006). Terra de Nheçu. Santo Ângelo: EDIURI, Culturarte. Online (in Portuguese).

Indigenous people of the Amazon
17th-century Brazilian people
17th-century indigenous people of the Americas
Indigenous leaders of the Americas